is a Japanese professional footballer who plays as a goalkeeper for Portimonense. He has represented the Japan national team internationally.

International career
In June 2011, Nakamura was called up to the Japan U17 national team for the 2011 FIFA U-17 World Cup and he played four matches. In August 2016, he was also selected for the Japan U23 national team for the 2016 Summer Olympics and he played two matches.

In May 2018 he was named in the Japan national team's squad for the 2018 FIFA World Cup in Russia.

Career statistics

Club

International

Honours
Individual
J.League Best XI: 2017

References

External links
 
 
 Profile at Kashiwa Reysol
 Profile at Avispa Fukuoka
 

1995 births
Living people
Association football people from Tokyo
Japanese footballers
Association football goalkeepers
Japan international footballers
Olympic footballers of Japan
Footballers at the 2016 Summer Olympics
2018 FIFA World Cup players
J.League U-22 Selection players
J1 League players
J2 League players
J3 League players
Kashiwa Reysol players
Avispa Fukuoka players
Portimonense S.C. players
Japanese expatriate footballers
Japanese expatriate sportspeople in Portugal
Expatriate footballers in Portugal